The Handelsblatt (literally "commerce paper" in English) is a German-language business newspaper published in Düsseldorf by Handelsblatt Media Group, formerly known as Verlagsgruppe Handelsblatt.

History and profile
Handelsblatt was established in 1946 by journalist Herbert Gross, but after some months Friedrich Vogel (1902–1976) became publisher. In 1969, Georg von Holtzbrinck became partner of Friedrich Vogel. Since 2021, its editor-in-chief is Sebastian Matthes. Its publisher, Handelsblatt Media Group, also publishes the weekly business magazine Wirtschaftswoche of which the editor-in-chief is Beat Balzli. Handelsblatt'''s headquarters are in Düsseldorf.

Since September 2005 Handelsblatt has been offering an online lexicon called WirtschaftsWiki which features definitions of terms used in economics and politics. The database can be modified by any registered user.

In September 2006 Handelsblatt ranked all economists working in Germany, Austria and the German-speaking part of Switzerland. The paper is published in compact format.

In 2009, Dieter von Holtzbrinck bought Der Tagesspiegel, Handelsblatt and Wirtschaftswoche from the Georg von Holtzbrinck Publishing Group.Handelsblatt had a circulation of 127,546 daily copies in 2018.

Handelsblatt Today

An English-language digital edition was launched in 2014, called Handelsblatt Global Edition, which aimed to reach an international audience interested in German business and finance news.  It was published five days a week from its editorial office in Berlin with editor-in-chief, Kevin O’Brien at the helm.  
In 2017, under a new editor-in-chief, Andreas Kluth, the publication avoided the direct translation of German-language articles and instead worked through differences between German and Anglophone journalistic traditions to add details that English readers were accustomed to.  The site was renamed Handelsblatt Today'' in 2018, but, unable to create a business model and reach a substantial audience to generate revenue, Kluth announced that publication would cease on 27 February 2019.

Anti-Vaccine controversy 
On the 25th of January 2021, Handelsblatt published an unsourced story falsely claiming that the Oxford-Astrazeneca COVID-19 vaccine was only 8% effective in over 65's. Astrazeneca and the University of Oxford issued statements denying these claims. This story was refuted by the German Health Ministry which clarified that 8% actually referred to the number of people in the study between 56 and 69 years old. Markus Lehmkuhl, the Karlsruhe Institute of Technology's Professor for Science Communication, stated that Handelsblatt “turned the matter into a ‘he says, she says’ story to absolve itself of responsibility for spreading stupid stuff."

Editors-in-chief 
 Herbert Gross (1946 for some months)
 Friedrich Vogel
 Hans Mundorf
 Thomas Knipp (2002–2004) and Bernd Ziesemer (2002–2010)
 Gabor Steingart (2010–2013)
 Hans-Jürgen Jakobs (2013–2016)
 Sven Afhüppe (2016–2020)
Sebastian Matthes (since 2020)

References

External links
Handelsblatt.com
Handelsblatt Today

1946 establishments in Germany
Business in Germany
Business newspapers published in Germany
Daily newspapers published in Germany
Economic liberalism
German-language newspapers
German news websites
Liberal media in Germany
Mass media in Düsseldorf
Publications established in 1946